Weinmannia pinnata, commonly known as the bastard briziletto,  is a species of tree in the family Cunoniaceae. It is native to Mexico, Central America, South America and the West Indies. It typically grows in wet habitats at high altitudes, and is one of the species found in dwarf forests perpetually wreathed in clouds.

Description
The trunk can reach  in diameter and the bark exudes an astringent gum. They are arranged in opposite pairs and have a winged midrib. The nine to twenty leaflets are oval, have serrated margins and rusty-brown hairs on the underside. The small flowers are in  spikes similar to those of the bottlebrush; the buds are tinged pink and the flowers are white with pink centres. The fruits are dry and red, and divided in two parts. They are tipped by the remains of the long style.

Distribution and habitat
In South America the species' range includes Colombia, Bolivia, Peru and Ecuador and in Central America it ranges from Panama to Guatemala. It is also native to Mexico. In the Caribbean it is present on the arc of islands from Cuba to St Lucia. Along with Prestoea montana, Brunellia comocladifolia and Podocarpus coriaceus, it is present in the wet cloud forests on the ridges and summits of the Sierra de Luquillo mountains in Puerto Rico.

References

pinnata
Trees of Mexico
Flora of South America
Flora of Central America
Flora of the Caribbean
Cloud forest flora of Mexico
Flora of the Talamancan montane forests